Mount Oliver was named in 1954 after Frank Oliver the founder of the Edmonton Bulletin. It is located in the Victoria Cross Ranges in Alberta.

See also
 Mountains of Alberta

References

Oliver
Oliver